Clements is an unincorporated community in San Joaquin County, California, United States. Clements has a post office with ZIP code 95227.

History
Clements was laid out in about 1872. The founder, Thomas Clements, gave the community his name. A post office has been in operation at Clements since 1882.

References

Unincorporated communities in California
Unincorporated communities in San Joaquin County, California